Alberto Guillermo Montaño Angulo (born 1970-03-23 in Esmeraldas) is a retired Ecuadorian international football central defender.

Club career
He was part of the Barcelona SC squad that reached the final of the Copa Libertadores in 1998.

Towards the end of his career he played for a number of teams in Ecuador before finishing his career in the lower leagues of Argentine football with Juventud Antoniana and then Atlanta and of Santiago Wanderers in Chile.

International career
He played 57 times for the Ecuador national team.

Honors

Nation
 
 Canada Cup: 1999

References

External links

Alberto Montaño at playmakerstats.com (English version of ceroacero.es)

1970 births
Living people
Sportspeople from Esmeraldas, Ecuador
Association football defenders
Ecuadorian footballers
Ecuador international footballers
1997 Copa América players
1999 Copa América players
Barcelona S.C. footballers
Santiago Wanderers footballers
Delfín S.C. footballers
C.D. Cuenca footballers
C.D. ESPOLI footballers
Club Atlético Atlanta footballers
Ecuadorian expatriate footballers
Expatriate footballers in Argentina
Expatriate footballers in Chile